Ultrastar may refer to:

 Western Digital brand of enterprise class hard disk drives and solid state drives
 Kolb Ultrastar ultralight aircraft
 Star Ultrastar, a pistol
 Ultimate sport's official flying disc
 UltraStar, a music video game
 UltraStar Cinemas, a movie theater chain.